The GV Tower Hotel is a budget hotel in Cebu City, Philippines and part of the GV Hotel Group, which operates 22 budget hotels across the Visayas and Mindanao region. It was constructed in 2004.

References

External links

Skyscraper hotels in the Philippines
Hotels in Cebu
Hotels established in 2004
Hotel buildings completed in 2004